Take My Time is the debut album by UK pop singer Sheena Easton. Released in January 1981, the album reached #17 in the UK and earned her a Gold Disc. Two months later, a ten track version of the album was released in the USA and Canada as Sheena Easton. The album went gold in the USA and platinum in Canada.

Background & Legacy 
After becoming suddenly famous due to her appearance on a television documentary in 1980 and with the hits "9 To 5" (which went gold) and "Modern Girl", Easton began recording her debut album with producer Christopher Neil. Easton later said that working with Neil was a great idea, remarking "They didn't just go: 'Right, just go sing Over the Rainbow or some cover', they brought in this top producer for me to work with". She says that although she didn't write the material on the album, Neil had a good ear for hit records and would send her tapes of songs from which she would decide which ones to record, "so I had a part in picking the hits, but I'm also guilty of picking the ones that were rubbish!" The style of the album was a combination of pure pop (e.g. "Take My Time" and "Voice on the Radio") and dramatic ballads ("When He Shines" and "Calm Before the Storm").

Of the other tracks recorded, Easton had already performed "When He Shines" at the Royal Variety Performance in November 1980, while "Prisoner" was a cover of a Sue Saad and the Next song released earlier in 1980. The album's opening track, "Don't Send Flowers" had recently been released as a single by British band Sailor, but had been unsuccessful.

The album charted in February 1981, just as Easton was finding fame in the US when "9 to 5" (retitled "Morning Train (Nine to Five)" to avoid confusion with a record by Dolly Parton called "9 To 5") took her to No. 1 in the charts there. In the UK, the album met with favourable response by reaching No. 17 and spent 19 weeks on the charts. In the US, it was released two months later and also made the top 30. By May 1981, three more singles were released from the collection, namely "One Man Woman", "Take My Time" and "When He Shines". With four of the singles reaching the top 20 in the UK (the title track reached a lower #44), Easton became the first female artist to score five top 50 singles hits from an album.

In the US, the album was simply titled Sheena Easton and included only two singles ("Morning Train" and "Modern Girl") before Easton was to chart highly with a new song, the James Bond theme "For Your Eyes Only".  "When He Shines" was not included on her debut, but went on to be included on her second US album, You Could Have Been With Me (it was also released as a single and reached #30 on the US Hot 100 in June 1982). Easton quickly became a staple on Adult Contemporary radio, where "Morning Train" also hit No. 1 and "Modern Girl" reached the top 10, both in 1981.

Producer Christopher Neil continued to work with Easton and produced her following two albums in a similar vein, before Easton decided to leave behind the pure-pop image she had gained.

Take My Time was re-released on Compact disc in the US on 19 June 1999 with bonus tracks by One Way Records. The UK version of the album was re-released on CD on 19 October 2009 with bonus tracks by Cherry Red Records. On 24 November 2014 the album was included in an Original Album Series box set in the UK with all of her first five albums with EMI through Warner Music Group.

Track listing 
Side One
"Don't Send Flowers" (Phil Pickett) 3.02
"Cry" (Frank Musker, Garth Murphy) 3.32
"Take My Time" (Paul Bliss, Phil Palmer) 2.39
"When He Shines" (Dominic Bugatti, Florrie Palmer) 3.56
"One Man Woman" (Mick Leeson, Peter Vale) 3.06
"Prisoner" (D.B. Cooper, James Lance, Tony Riparetti) 3.34
Side Two
"9 to 5" (Florrie Palmer) 3.20
"So Much In Love" (Dominic Bugatti, Frank Musker) 3.04
"Voice On the Radio" (Florrie Palmer, Peter Vale) 3.18
"Calm Before the Storm" (Christopher Neil, Peter Vale) 3.28
"Modern Girl" (Dominic Bugatti, Frank Musker) 3.37
"No One Ever Knows" (Mick Leeson, Peter Vale) 3.47

Bonus tracks later released on CD
 "Paradox" (Christopher Neil) 2.40
 "Moody (My Love)" (Easton, Christopher Neil) 2.07
 "Summer's Over" (Florrie Palmer, Christopher Neil) 3.24
 "Right or Wrong" (Florrie Palmer) 3.17

Track listing (US, Canada)
Side One
 "Morning Train (9 to 5)"
 "Don't Send Flowers"
 "Cry"
 "Take My Time"
 "Prisoner"
Side Two
 "Modern Girl"
 "So Much In Love"
 "Voice On the Radio"
 "One Man Woman"
 "Calm Before the Storm"

Bonus tracks later released on CD
 "Family of One" (Mick Leeson, Peter Vale)
 "Please Don't Sympathize" (Thompson)
 "Right or Wrong"
 "Paradox"
 "Summer's Over"

Personnel 
 Sheena Easton – lead vocals
 Derek Austin – keyboards
 David Cullen – keyboards, horn arrangements
 William Lyall – keyboards
 Ian Lynn – keyboards
 Peter Vale – keyboards, backing vocals
 Phil Palmer – guitars
 Andy Brown – bass
 Peter Van Hooke – drums
 Frank Ricotti – percussion
 Tony Hall – saxophone
 Sharon Campbell – backing vocals
 Alan Carvell – backing vocals
 Kim Goody – backing vocals
 Frank Musker – backing vocals
 Christopher Neil – backing vocals

Production 
 Producer – Christopher Neil
 Engineer – Nick Ryan
 Assistant Engineers – Tony George, Simon Hurrell and Brett Kennedy.
 Recorded at AIR Studios (Montserrat, West Indies).
 Remixed at Audio International Studios (London, England).
 Design – Peter Shepherd
 Photography – Brian Aris
 Management – D & J Arlon Enterprises Ltd.

Chart performance

Certifications

References

Sheena Easton albums
1981 debut albums
Albums produced by Christopher Neil
EMI Records albums
EMI America Records albums
Albums recorded at AIR Studios